Birodi, India may refer to:
 Birodi Chhoti, a village in Sikar district in Rajasthan state in India
 Birodi Bari, a village in Sikar district in Rajasthan state in India